The Aruncător de grenade 40 mm (AG-40) is a rifle-mounted 40 mm grenade launcher. It is mounted as a lower handguard for a Kalashnikov pattern rifle. The AG-40 is currently used on the 5.45mm PA md. 86 standard assault rifle, in Romanian service. It replaced the older GP-25 Soviet-pattern grenade launcher.

Technical data 

The AG-40 grenade launcher is manufactured by ROMARM SA and has the following technical specifications:

Users 

 : Used by Infantry, Mountain Hunters, and Combat Divers.
 : Locally produced.

Variants 
 AG-40P - basic model (40x47 mm cartridge)
 AG-40PN - uses the 40x46 mm NATO cartridge
 AL-38 - anti-riot launcher version (38 mm caliber)

References

External link
 

40×47mm grenade launchers
Firearms of Romania